Jack Byrne may refer to:

Jack Byrne (1920s footballer), Irish footballer
Jack Byrne (politician) (1951–2008), Canadian politician
Jack Byrne (footballer, born 1996), Irish footballer

See also
John Byrne (disambiguation)
Jack Burns (disambiguation)